Thomas Henry Martin (17 November 1888 – 30 January 1949) was an Australian rules footballer who played with Geelong in the Victorian Football League (VFL).

Notes

External links 

1888 births
1949 deaths
Australian rules footballers from Victoria (Australia)
Australian Rules footballers: place kick exponents
Geelong Football Club players